Poplar Hospital was a medical facility opened in East India Dock Road in London, England, in 1855. It was opened under the patronage of Samuel Gurney, MP to treat people who had suffered injuries in the docks. The  premises which were leased for the hospital  were originally those of the East India Dock Tavern and then subsequently the Custom House. 

Under Sydney Holland's Chairmanship the Hospital was able to expand considerably in the late nineteenth century.  Holland was well-known for his successful fundraising, for which he earned the nickname ‘Prince of Beggars’. In a four-year period Holland raised sufficient funds to enlarge the hospital from 36 to over 100 beds, improved the nursing care, and the hospital’s reputation.

The hospital was repeatedly expanded to cater for more patients, only being closed in 1975. It was demolished in 1982.

From the 17th to the early 19th Centuries, the British East India Company (EIC) maintained a hospital in the area known as Poplar Hospital.<ref>Statutes at Large ...: (29 v. in 32) Statutes or the United Kingdom. (1821), pp.211-3.</ref> The hospital had been established in March 1628 as an almshouse for its mariners.

 Notable Staff 

 Emma Pilcher (abt 1845- ) , Matron 1883- until about 1891. She had previously trained at St Thomas's Hospital and Inverness. Pilcher was the first of three London Hospital  nurses to  work as Matron at Poplar in succession for over a forty year period.
 Gertrude Vacher (abt 1864- ), Matron 1891-1895. Vacher  trained at The London Hospital as both a paying and ordinary probationer between 1885-1887.  Whilst matron at Poplar she was seriously ill with Pneumonia, and resigned following her recovery. Sydney Holland purchased a grave plot at Brompton Cemetery, and organised death announcements. 
 Selina Elizabeth Bland (1855-1931), Matron 1895-1926. Bland trained at The London Hospital under Eva Luckes from 1895-1897. Bland's application was supported by the House Committee at The London, and  Sydney Holland, The Poplar Hospital Chairman was very pleased with other London Hospital trained nurses  who had moved to nurse at Poplar. 

Citations and references
Citations

References
Makepeace, Margaret (2010) The East India Company's London Workers: Management of the Warehouse Labourers, 1800-1858''. (Boydell & Brewer). 

Defunct hospitals in London
Poplar, London
Buildings and structures demolished in 1982
Demolished buildings and structures in London